The Central District of Landeh County is a district (bakhsh) in Landeh County, Kohgiluyeh and Boyer-Ahmad Province, Iran. At the 2006 census, its population was 19,145, in 3,603 families.  The District has one city: Landeh. The District has two rural districts (dehestan): Olya Tayeb Rural District and Tayebi-ye Garmsiri-ye Shomali Rural District. The district was established in 2012.

References 

Districts of Kohgiluyeh and Boyer-Ahmad Province
Landeh County
2012 establishments in Iran